Alkimos College is an Independent public co-educational  high day school, located in the Perth suburb of Alkimos, Western Australia.

Overview

The far northern suburbs of Perth are some of the fastest growing areas of the metropolitan area. There was a need for another secondary school to relieve pressure on Butler College, which had almost 1,800 students in 2018. The school started construction on stage 1 in 2018, with Butler North Secondary School as a planning name. Stage 1 involves construction of classrooms, administration, student services, a cafeteria and sports facilities. It cost $48.4 million.

A community survey was done in March 2019 to determine the school's name. The options were Alkimos College, Alkimos Secondary College and Alkimos Community College. Alkimos College was decided to be the name of the school.

There are various sculptures around the school that are inspired by the Alkimos wreck and the local coastline and ocean, built as part of the Western Australian Government's percent for art scheme. The Alkimos wreck sculpture is lit up at night, making it visible to the surrounding suburb.

The school opened as Alkimos College to 176 Year 7 students. It is planned to grow to 1,500 Year 7 to 12 students in 2025. Stage 2 of construction is planned to be complete by 2024, in time for the first cohort of Year 11 students. Stage 2 includes additional classrooms and a performing arts centre. An additional secondary school is projected to be needed in Alkimos by 2024.

Programs

Specialised Autism Learning Program

Alkimos College is one of 16 schools in Western Australia to operate a specialised autism spectrum disorder learning program. It is a Department of Education endorsed program. The program is also in place at Alkimos Primary School, so local students in the program can have a seamless transition between Kindergarten and Year 12.

Local intake area

Alkimos College's local intake area covers Alkimos, Eglinton (south of Pipidinny Road), part of Jindalee (north of Oceania Avenue) and part of Butler. Students living in the local intake area have a guaranteed place at the school if they apply.

Student numbers

See also

 List of schools in the Perth metropolitan area

References

Public high schools in Perth, Western Australia
Educational institutions established in 2020
2020 establishments in Australia